Tillandsia oerstediana is a species of flowering plant in the bromeliad family Bromeliaceae. It is an epiphyte that is found on open forested slopes in wet tropical areas. Tillandsia oerstediana is native to Costa Rica and western Panama.

Description 
Tillandsia oerstediana is an evergreen plant with grey-green leaves arranged in a rosette up to 40cm across. When in bloom, it has a  golden coloured flowerspike of waxy yellow bracts with tiny, tubular pink flowers.

References

oerstediana
Flora of Costa Rica